Heng-o Corona is a corona in Guinevere Planitia on the planet Venus at Latitude 2° North, Longitude 355° East.

It is named after Heng'e, the original name of Chang'e, the Chinese goddess of the Moon.

Geography and geology
Heng-o Corona is located on the eastern Guinevere. Within the faulted ring system of Heng-o Corona lies several small impact craters and intricate fractures which trend to the north and to the northwest of the corona.

See also
List of coronae on Venus

References

Surface features of Venus